The Australian National University (ANU) is a public research university and member of the Group of Eight, located in Canberra, the capital of Australia. Its main campus in Acton encompasses seven teaching and research colleges, in addition to several national academies and institutes.

ANU is ranked as the top university in Australia and the Southern Hemisphere by the 2022 QS World University Rankings and second in Australia in the Times Higher Education rankings. Compared to other universities in the world, it is ranked 27th by the 2022 QS World University Rankings, and equal 54th by the 2022 Times Higher Education. In 2021, ANU is ranked 20th (1st in Australia) by the Global Employability University Ranking and Survey (GEURS).

Established in 1946, ANU is the only university to have been created by the Parliament of Australia. It traces its origins to Canberra University College, which was established in 1929 and was integrated into ANU in 1960. ANU enrols 10,052 undergraduate and 10,840 postgraduate students and employs 3,753 staff. The university's endowment stood at A$1.8 billion as of 2018.

ANU counts six Nobel laureates and 49 Rhodes scholars among its faculty and alumni. The university has educated two prime ministers and more than a dozen current heads of government departments of Australia. The latest releases of ANU's scholarly publications are held through ANU Press online.

History

Post-war origins
Calls for the establishment of a national university in Australia began as early as 1900. After the location of the nation's capital, Canberra, was determined in 1908, land was set aside for the university at the foot of Black Mountain in the city designs by Walter Burley Griffin. Planning for the university was disrupted by World War II but resumed with the creation of the Department of Post-War Reconstruction in 1942, ultimately leading to the passage of the Australian National University Act 1946 by the Chifley Government on 1 August 1946.

A group of eminent Australian scholars returned from overseas to join the university, including Sir Howard Florey (co-developer of medicinal penicillin),  Sir Mark Oliphant (a nuclear physicist who worked on the Manhattan Project), and Sir Keith Hancock (the Chichele Professor of Economic History at Oxford). The group also included a New Zealander, Sir Raymond Firth (a professor of anthropology at LSE), who had earlier worked in Australia for some years. Economist Sir Douglas Copland was appointed as ANU's first Vice-Chancellor and former Prime Minister Stanley Bruce served as the first Chancellor. ANU was originally organised into four centres—the Research Schools of Physical Sciences, Social Sciences and Pacific Studies and the John Curtin School of Medical Research.

The first residents' hall, University House, was opened in 1954 for faculty members and postgraduate students. Mount Stromlo Observatory, established by the federal government in 1924, became part of ANU in 1957. The first locations of the ANU Library, the Menzies and Chifley buildings, opened in 1963. The Australian Forestry School, located in Canberra since 1927, was amalgamated by ANU in 1965.

Canberra University College
Canberra University College (CUC) was the first institution of higher education in the national capital, having been established in 1929 and enrolling its first undergraduate pupils in 1930. Its founding was led by Sir Robert Garran, one of the drafters of the Australian Constitution and the first Solicitor-General of Australia. CUC was affiliated with the University of Melbourne and its degrees were granted by that university. Academic leaders at CUC included historian Manning Clark, political scientist Finlay Crisp, poet A. D. Hope and economist Heinz Arndt.

In 1960, CUC was integrated into ANU as the School of General Studies, initially with faculties in arts, economics, law and science. Faculties in Oriental studies and engineering were introduced later. Bruce Hall, the first residential college for undergraduates, opened in 1961.

Modern era
The Canberra School of Music and the Canberra School of Art combined in 1988 to form the Canberra Institute of the Arts, and amalgamated with the university as the ANU Institute of the Arts in 1992.

ANU established its Medical School in 2002, after obtaining federal government approval in 2000.

On 18 January 2003, the Canberra bushfires largely destroyed the Mount Stromlo Observatory. ANU astronomers now conduct research from the Siding Spring Observatory, which contains 10 telescopes including the Anglo-Australian Telescope.

In February 2013, financial entrepreneur and ANU graduate Graham Tuckwell made the largest university donation in Australian history by giving $50 million to fund an undergraduate scholarship program at ANU.

ANU is well known for its history of student activism and, in recent years, its fossil fuel divestment campaign, which is one of the longest-running and most successful in the country. The decision of the ANU Council to divest from two fossil fuel companies in 2014 was criticised by ministers in the Abbott government, but defended by Vice Chancellor Ian Young, who noted:  ANU holds investments in major fossil fuel companies.

A survey conducted by the Australian Human Rights Commission in 2017 found that the ANU had the second-highest incidence of sexual assault and sexual harassment. 3.5 per cent of respondents from the ANU reported being sexually assaulted in 2016. Vice Chancellor Brian Schmidt apologised to victims of sexual assault and harassment.

The ANU had funding and staff cuts in the School of Music in 2011–15 and in the School of Culture, History and Language in 2016. However, there is a range of global (governmental) endowments available for Arts and Social Sciences, designated only for ANU. Some courses are now delivered online.

ANU has exchange agreements in place for its students with many foreign universities, most notably in the Asia-Pacific region, including the National University of Singapore, the University of Tokyo, the University of Hong Kong, Peking University, Tsinghua University and Seoul National University. In other regions, notable universities include Université Paris Sciences et Lettres the George Washington University, the University of California, the University of Texas, the University of Toronto in North America and Imperial College London, King's College London, Sciences Po, ETH Zürich, Bocconi University, the University of Copenhagen and Trinity College Dublin in Europe.

In 2017, Chinese hackers infiltrated the computers of Australian National University, potentially compromising national security research conducted at the university.

Campus

ANU is roughly bisected by Sullivans Creek, part of the Murray–Darling basin, and is bordered by the native bushland of Black Mountain, Lake Burley Griffin, the suburb of Turner and the Canberra central business district. Many university sites are of historical significance dating from the establishment of the national capital, with over 40 buildings recognised by the Commonwealth Heritage List and several others on local lists.

With over 10,000 trees on its campus, ANU won an International Sustainable Campus Network Award in 2009 and was ranked the 2nd greenest university campus in Australia in 2011.

Four of Australia's five learned societies are based at ANU—the Australian Academy of Science, the Australian Academy of the Humanities, the Academy of the Social Sciences in Australia and the Australian Academy of Law. The Australian National Centre for the Public Awareness of Science and the National Film and Sound Archive are also located at ANU, while the National Museum of Australia and CSIRO are situated next to the campus.

ANU occupies additional locations including Mount Stromlo Observatory on the outskirts of Canberra, Siding Spring Observatory near Coonabarabran, a campus at Kioloa on the South Coast of New South Wales and a research unit in Darwin.

Library

The library of ANU originated in 1948 with the appointment of the first librarian, Arthur McDonald. The library holds over 2.5 million physical volumes distributed across six branches—the Chifley, Menzies, Hancock, Art & Music, and Law Libraries and the external Print Repository. Chifley and Hancock library are both accessible for ANU staff and students 24 hours a day.

Residential halls and colleges

Eleven residential facilities are affiliated with ANU—Bruce Hall, Burgmann College, Burton & Garron Hall, Fenner Hall, Gowrie Hall, Graduate House, John XXIII College, Toad Hall, Ursula Hall, Wamburun Hall, and Wright Hall. All are located on campus except Gowrie Hall, which is located in the nearby suburb of Braddon. Students also reside in the privately run units adjoining the campus—Davey Lodge, Kinloch Lodge, Warrumbul Lodge and Lena Karmel Lodge. In 2010, the non-residential Griffin Hall was established for students living off-campus. Another off-campus student accommodation was launched by UniGardens Pty, University Gardens located in Belconnen.

In 2014, 2019 and 2020 there were major protests organised by student leaders across all of the ANU's halls of residence against steep rent hikes, neglect of pastoral care support, and repeated failures to address issues relating to sexual assault and sexual harassment. Though supported by a majority of students living on residence, the ANU's response to past protests has been mixed, with many recommendations and requests for student consultations ignored. The outcome of the 2020 protests revolve around demands for stronger SASH policy, accountability surrounding tariff rises, and commitments to adequate pastoral care; the outcome of these protests is as yet unknown.

Drill Hall Gallery

The Drill Hall Gallery is housed a drill hall dating from the 1940s, for use in training soldiers for the Second World War, and as base for 3rd Battalion, Werriwa Regiment. The interior was remodelled to create an art gallery in 1984, and in 2004 the building was heritage-listed. Temporary exhibitions of the national collection were held in the all while the National Gallery of Australia was being built. ANU took over the hall in 1992 to exhibit its own collection of artworks, and also as a venue for temporary exhibitions.

There are four separate exhibition spaces, which provide the venues not only for exhibitions developed by or in collaboration with the university, but also to accompany major conferences and public events. The venue hosts both national and international exhibitions. Sidney Nolan's  panorama, Riverbend, which comprises nine panels, ís on permanent display at the Drill Hall Gallery.

Academic structure

Colleges
ANU was reorganised in 2006 to create seven Colleges, each College leads both teaching and research.

Arts and Social Sciences

The ANU College of Arts and Social Sciences is divided into the Research School of Social Sciences (RSSS) and the Research School of Humanities and the Arts (RSHA). Within RSSS there are schools dedicated to history, philosophy, sociology, political science and international relations, Middle Eastern studies and Latin American studies. RSHA contains schools focusing on anthropology, archaeology, classics, art history, English literature, drama, film studies, gender studies, linguistics, European languages as well as an art and music school. In 2017, ANU ranked 6th in the world for politics, 8th in the world for Social Policy and Administration and 11th in the world for development studies.

It is also home to the Australian Studies Institute, the Centre for Aboriginal Economic Policy Research (CAEPR), and the ANU Centre for Social Research and Methods (CSRM).

The college's School of Philosophy houses the ANU Centre for Consciousness and the ANU Centre for Philosophy of the Sciences, as well as the ANU Centre for Moral, Social and Political Theory (CMSPT), an organization whose purpose is to "become a world-leading forum for exposition and analysis of the evolution, structure, and implications of our moral, social and political life." Its president is Nicholas Southwood and key people include Seth Lazar, Geoff Brennan, Bob Goodin, Frank Jackson, Philip Pettit and Michael Smith.

Asia and the Pacific
The ANU College of Asia and the Pacific (CAP) is a specialist centre of Asian and Pacific studies and languages, among the largest collections of experts in these fields of any university in the English-speaking world. The college is home to four academic schools: the Crawford School of Public Policy, a research intensive public policy school; the School of Culture, History and Language, the nation's centre dedicated to investigating and learning with and about the people, languages, and lands of Asia and the Pacific; Coral Bell School of Asia Pacific Affairs, Australia's foremost collection of expertise in the politics and international affairs of Asia and the Pacific; and the School of Regulation and Global Governance (RegNet, formerly the Regulatory Institutions Network), a world-renowned research school dedicated to the interdisciplinary study of regulation and governance.

The college also houses the Australian Centre on China in the World, the Strategic and Defence Studies Centre and the Council for Security Cooperation in the Asia Pacific (CSCAP), Australia. It has dedicated regional institutes for China, Indonesia, Japan, Korea, Malaysia, Mongolia, Myanmar, the Pacific, Southeast Asia and South Asia. The college hosts a series annual and biannual updates, on various regions in the Asia-Pacific. The Crawford School of Public Policy houses the Asia Pacific Arndt-Cohen Department of Economics, the Asia Pacific Network for Environmental Governance (APNEG), the Australia-Japan Research Centre, The Centre for Applied Macroeconomic Analysis, the Centre for Nuclear Non-Proliferation and Disarmament, the East Asian Bureau of Economic Research, the Tax and Transfer Policy Institute, the ANU National Security College, the East Asia Forum publication and a number of other centres. The Crawford School of Public Policy also hosts offices and programs for the Australia and New Zealand School of Government (ANZSOG). Many high performing Year in Asia program students gain the opportunity to travel to an Asian country of their choosing to study for one year specializing in one Asian language.

The college also has affiliation with Indiana University's Pan Asia Institute.

Business and Economics

The ANU College of Business and Economics comprises four Research Schools, which carries research and teaching in economics, finance, accounting, actuarial studies, statistics, marketing and management. Dedicated research centres within these schools include the Social Policy Evaluation, Analysis and Research Centre, the Australian National Centre for Audit and Assurance Research, the ANU Centre for Economic History, the National Centre for Information Systems Research and the ANU Centre for Economic Policy Research. The college is professionally accredited with the Institute of Chartered Accountants Australia, CPA Australia, the Australian Computer Society, the Actuaries Institute Australia, the Institute of Public Accountants, the Association of International Accountants, the Chartered Financial Analyst Institute and the Statistical Society of Australia Inc. It also has membership of the World Wide Web Consortium (W3C).

Engineering and Computer Science

The ANU College of Engineering, Computing, and Cybernetics is divided into two Research Schools, which study a range of engineering and computer science topics respectively. ANU is home to the National Computational Infrastructure National Facility and was a co-founder of NICTA, the chief information and communications technology research centre in Australia. Research groups in ANU College of Engineering and Computer Science include Algorithms and Data, Applied Signal Processing, Artificial Intelligence, Centre for Sustainable Energy Systems, Computer Systems, Computer Vision and Robotics, Data-Intensive Computing, Information and Human Centred Computing, Logic & Computation, Materials and Manufacturing, Semiconductor and Solar Cells, Software Intensive Systems Engineering, Solar Thermal Group, Systems and Control. Disciplinary areas include theories, operations and cutting-edge research that will enhance user experience by integrating ever-evolving information technology methods in engineering applications, with the emphasis on energy source.

Law

The ANU College of Law covers legal research and teaching, with centres dedicated to commercial law, international law, public law and environmental law. In addition to numerous research programs, the college offers the professional LL.B. and J.D. degrees. It is the 7th oldest of Australia's 36 law schools and was ranked 2nd among Australian and 12th among world law schools by the 2018 QS Rankings. Students are given the chance to spend three weeks in Geneva concerning the institutional practice of International Law.

Medicine, Biology and Environment

The ANU College of Medicine, Biology and Environment encompasses the John Curtin School of Medical Research (JCSMR), the ANU Medical School, the Fenner School of Environment & Society and Research Schools of Biology, Psychology and Population Health. JCSMR was established in 1948 as a result of the vision of Nobel laureate Howard Florey. Three further Nobel Prizes have been won as a result of research at JCSMR—in 1963 by John Eccles and in 1996 by Peter Doherty and Rolf M. Zinkernagel.

Physical and Mathematical Sciences

The ANU College of Physical & Mathematical Sciences comprises the Research Schools of Astronomy & Astrophysics, Chemistry, Earth Sciences, Mathematical Sciences and Physics. Under the direction of Mark Oliphant, nuclear physics was one of the university's most notable early research priorities, leading to the construction of a 500 megajoule homopolar generator and a 7.7 megaelectronvolts cyclotron in the 1950s. These devices were to be used as part of a 10.6 gigaelectronvolt synchrotron particle accelerator that was never completed, however they remained in use for other research purposes. ANU has been home to eight particle accelerators over the years and operates the 14UD and LINAS accelerators. Brian Schmidt (astrophysicist at Mount Stromlo Observatory) received the 2011 Nobel Prize for Physics for his work on the accelerating expansion of the universe.

Governance and funding 

ANU is governed by a 15-member Council, whose members include the Chancellor and Vice-Chancellor. Gareth Evans, a former Foreign Minister of Australia, was ANU Chancellor from 2010 to December 2019 and Brian Schmidt, an astrophysicist and Nobel Laureate, has served as Vice-Chancellor since 1 January 2016. Evans was succeeded as Chancellor by a fellow former Foreign Minister, Julie Bishop, in January 2020.

Finances
At the end of 2018, ANU recorded an endowment of A$1.8 billion.

Rankings

ANU was ranked 27th in the world (first in Australia) by the 2022 QS World University Rankings, and equal 54th in the world, and equal 2nd in Australia (with the University of Queensland), by the 2022 Times Higher Education.

In the QS World University Rankings by Subject 2020, ANU was ranked 6th in the world for geology, 7th for philosophy, 8th in the world for politics, 9th in the world for sociology, 13th in the world for development studies and 15th in the world for linguistics.

A 2017 study by Times Higher Education reported that ANU was the world's 7th (first in Australia) most international university.

In the 2020 Times Higher Education Global Employability University Ranking, an annual ranking of university graduates' employability, ANU was ranked 15th in the world (first in Australia).

Student life
Australian National University Students' Association (ANUSA) is the students' union of the Australian National University and represents undergraduate and ANU College students, while the Postgraduate and Research Students' Association (PARSA) represents postgraduates. The Australian National University Union manages catering and retail outlets and function amenities on behalf of all students.

Woroni 
Woroni is the student magazine of the Australian National University, first formed in 1947. Woroni is published fortnightly in full colour tabloid format, and features broad coverage of university and local news, opinion, features, arts and culture, sports, and leisure. Most of the newspaper since its beginnings have been digitised through the Australian Newspapers Digitisation Program of the National Library of Australia. Woroni also features an online radio broadcast, Woroni Radio, as well as video production through Woroni TV.

Network compromise
The network of the university was subject to serious compromise from November 9 to December 21, 2018.  ABC News reported that the initial breach occurred when a phishing message was previewed. After investigating, the university published a report on the incident. Recommendations from the Chief Information Security Officer to avoid further compromise are generally applicable.

Notable alumni and faculty

Faculty
Notable past faculty include Mark Oliphant, Keith Hancock, Manning Clark, Derek Freeman, H. C. Coombs, Gareth Evans, John Crawford, Hedley Bull, Frank Fenner, C. P. Fitzgerald, Pierre Ryckmans, A. L. Basham, Bernhard Neumann, and former Indonesian Vice-president Boediono. Nobel Prizes have been awarded to former ANU Chancellor Howard Florey and faculty members John Eccles, John Harsanyi, Rolf M. Zinkernagel, Peter Doherty and Brian Schmidt. Notable present scholars include Hilary Charlesworth, Ian McAllister, Hugh White, Warwick McKibbin, Keith Dowding, Amin Saikal and Jeremy Shearmur.

Alumni
ANU alumni are often visible in government. Bob Hawke and Kevin Rudd, former Australian Prime Ministers, attended the university, as did senior politicians Annastacia Palaszczuk, Barry O'Farrell, Nick Minchin, Kim Beazley Sr, Peter Garrett, Craig Emerson, Stephen Conroy, Gary Gray, Warren Snowdon, Joe Ludwig and Catherine King and Michael Keenan. ANU has produced 30 current Australian Ambassadors, and more than a dozen current heads of Australian Public Service departments, including Prime Minister & Cabinet secretaries Michael Thawley and Martin Parkinson, Finance secretary Jane Halton, Education secretary Lisa Paul, Agriculture secretary Paul Grimes, Attorney-General's secretary Chris Moraitis, Environment secretary Gordon de Brouwer, Employment secretary Renee Leon, Social Services secretary Finn Pratt, Industry secretary Glenys Beauchamp, Australian Secret Intelligence Service director-general Nick Warner and Australian Competition & Consumer Commission chairman Rod Sims. Graduates also include Prime Minister of the Solomon Islands Gordon Darcy Lilo, Foreign Minister of Mongolia Damdin Tsogtbaatar, former Indonesian Foreign Minister Marty Natalegawa, former Governor of the Reserve Bank of New Zealand Don Brash, former British Secretary of State for Health Patricia Hewitt and former U.S. Ambassador to Israel Martin Indyk.

Other notable alumni include High Court of Australia judges Stephen Gageler and Geoffrey Nettle, Fijian archaeologist Tarisi Vunidilo, Wallisian member of the Congress of New Caledonia Ilaïsaane Lauouvéa, Chief Federal Magistrate John Pascoe, political journalist Stan Grant, human rights lawyer Jennifer Robinson, former Chief of Army David Morrison, Kellogg's CEO John Bryant, former Singapore Airlines CEO Cheong Choong Kong, Indiana University president Michael McRobbie, University of Melbourne Vice-Chancellors Alan Gilbert and Glyn Davis, mathematician John H. Coates, computer programmer Andrew Tridgell, public intellectual Clive Hamilton, journalist Bettina Arndt, and economists John Deeble, Ross Garnaut, Peter Drysdale, John Quiggin and commercial litigator Jozef Maynard Borja Erece, the youngest law graduate in Australian history.

Honorary doctorate recipients
Notable Honorary Doctorate recipients have included former Australian public officials Stanley Bruce, Robert Menzies, Richard Casey, Angus Houston, Brendan Nelson, Owen Dixon, Australian notable persons Sidney Nolan, Norman Gregg, Charles Bean, foreign dignitaries Harold Macmillan, Lee Kuan Yew, Aung San Suu Kyi, Sheikh Hasina, K. R. Narayanan, Nelson Mandela, Desmond Tutu, Saburo Okita and notable foreign scientists John Cockcroft, Jan Hendrik Oort and Alexander R. Todd.

Affiliations
ANU is a member of the Group of Eight, Association of Pacific Rim Universities, the International Alliance of Research Universities, UNESCO Chairs, U7 Alliance, Winter Institute. and Global Scholars Program.

ANU participates in the US Financial Direct Loan program. The RG Menzies Scholarship to Harvard University is awarded annually to at least one talented Australian who has gained admission to a Harvard graduate school. ANU and University of Melbourne are the only two Australian partner universities of Yale University's Fox Fellowship program. ANU has exchange partnership with Yale University, Brown University, MIT and Oxford University, and ANU has a research partnership with Harvard University.

See also

ANU research centres and institutes
ARC Training Centre for Automated Manufacture of Advanced Composites
Australian National University Boat Club
List of universities in Australia

Notes

References

External links

Australian National University

 
National universities
1946 establishments in Australia
Educational institutions established in 1946
Universities in the Australian Capital Territory
Buildings and structures in Canberra
Group of Eight (Australian universities)